Scientologikirken (Church of Scientology) is not recognised as a religious community, but as a non-profit corporation. Although it is estimated that around 8000 people have taken scientology-related courses in Norway, the church only has around 100 active members. 

Scientologikirken has only one official church, in Oslo, which has located and relocated among various places within the capital, ranging from fashionable offices in a thriving city center on Karl Johans gate and Tollbugata, to its current location on Grünerløkka, in strong contrast to other Church of Scientology headquarters. The church is currently located at Torggata 28 next to Youngstorget in downtown Oslo.

Scientologikirken has a history of settling legal cases out of court, it was sentenced to refund 600.000 Norwegian kroner worth of course fees to a former member, in addition to the unsuccessful 6-year-long legal battle to grant it status as a religion.

Due to the small amount of active members and no governmental subsidies, the church has an overall small income, relying mostly on participants paying for single courses.

In August 2015,a banner was placed covering the front facade of the Scientologikirken, saying "New homes, coming soon", indicating the church longer being present there. They have since moved back to their old headquarters in Tollbugata, but leaving behind nine months (292,434 Norwegian kroner, or $33,707) of unpaid rent.

Controversies 
The church was also accused of contributing to murder in the high-profile case of Kaja Ballo's suicide. Ballo was the daughter of parliamentary minister Olav Gunnar Ballo.

As a result of the bad light that was shed upon the church, it has become vastly unpopular and controversial in Norway. Members usually keep a low profile and are reluctant to share their religious beliefs. Norwegians in general regard Scientologikirken as a cult.

Despite low membership numbers, the Norwegian community has made a name for itself among opposition-groups. There are often protests outside of the Oslo church, with Anonymous being very present. This is not the only reason; Andreas Heldal-Lund is a known critic of Scientology, and is the founder of xenu.net and Operation Clambake.

References

Sources 

Religion in Norway
Norway